Vaour is a commune and cantonal administrative centre located in the northwestern part of the Tarn department in southern France.

On the north the commune borders the Tarn and Garonne department, and the rising land consists of a gray limestone causse stretching almost to the Averyon river seven or eight kilometers away. Below the commune to the south the landscape consists of the forest of Grésigne - the largest oak forest in the midi - its hills scattered with grassy meadows, and the vineyards of Gaillac.

Vaour contains the ruins of a Templar Commanderie which overlooks the village of Vaour and has commanding views to the South West towards the Pyrenees.  The commune also hosts a performing arts festival each summer known as the Été de Vaour  which attracts visitors and performers from across France and further afield.  The village hosts a market for good local produce each Thursday in the village square.

See also
Communes of the Tarn department

References

Communes of Tarn (department)